Lympstone is a village and civil parish in East Devon in the English county of Devon. It has a population of 1,754. There is a harbour on the estuary of the River Exe, lying at the outlet of Wotton Brook between cliffs of red breccia. The promontory to the north of the harbour is topped by a flat pasture, Cliff Field, that is managed by the National Trust and used for football matches and other local events.

Lympstone has rail services on the Avocet Line to Exmouth and Exeter from Lympstone Village railway station.

It is known locally for Peter's Tower, an Italianate riverfront brick clock tower built around 1885 by W.H. Peters as a memorial to his wife, and for its tradition of residents drying washing on the foreshore. The riverside houses back directly on to the shore, with no continuous seawall, and the passageways between them to the beach are equipped with metal flood gates that are closed by residents when they are warned of high tides by a local alert network.

Lympstone Manor is an historical house which now provides hotel and restaurant accommodation. The parish church is the Church of the Nativity of the Blessed Virgin Mary.

Near the village is the Commando Training Centre Royal Marines (CTCRM), the principal military training centre for the Royal Marines.  The training centre has its own dedicated railway halt, Lympstone Commando (not in public use), on the Exeter–Exmouth branch line.

Sport and leisure
Lympstone AFC were formed in 1906, they have sides in the Devon & Exeter Football League.

Lympstone has a non-league football club Royal Marines A.F.C. who play at Endurance Park CTCRM. They have since folded in April 2012.

The Exeter–Exmouth cycle route passes through the village. The cycle route is popular for commuters and recreational cyclists. Prior to the opening of the cycle route the only direct route to cycle between Exmouth and Exeter was along the busy A376. The cycle route passes through the centre of the village bringing custom to the shop, cafe and pubs and adds to the vibrancy and sustainability of the village centre and its businesses. Despite this, a minority group is currently campaigning to change the route and are concerned it affects the village centre and could be made safer for users and villagers.

The 1st Lympstone Sea Scouts Group celebrated its centenary in 2012. It currently has flourishing Scout and Cub sections. It meets in the Scout HQ on Cliff Field.

Notable people 
Ralph Lane, equerry to Queen Elizabeth I, was born in Lympstone. He was a soldier who went with Sir Walter Raleigh on his second expedition to the New World in 1585. He founded a colony on Roanoke Island amidst great hardship and deprivation. He was later present at the defeat of the Spanish Armada. 
Theophilus Rhys-Jones (d. 1959), headmaster of St Peter's Preparatory School, Harefield, Lympstone, and paternal grandfather of Sophie, Countess of Wessex
Singer and lead guitarist of The Kinks, Dave Davies, lived in Lympstone in the 1990s. 
Former Tottenham Hotspur footballer Steve Perryman currently resides in Lympstone.
John Nutt (before 1600 – after 1632) was an English pirate. He was one of the more notorious brigands of his time raiding the coast of southern Canada and western England for over three years before his capture by Sir John Eliot in 1623. His arrest and conviction caused a scandal in the English court, after Nutt paid Eliot £500 in exchange for a pardon, and was eventually released by Secretary of State George Calvert.
Francis Augustus Eliott, 2nd Baron Heathfield, British Army officer, and son of the revolutionary general, George Augustus Eliott, inherited the Lord of the Manor of Lympstone from his uncle, alongside the Manor at Nutwell (then in Lympstone). Lord Heathfield spent the next 5 years (1798-1803) rebuilding Nutwell Court to its current appearance, whilst living at nearby Gulliford Farm.

See also
Lympstone Commando railway station

References

Further reading

External links

Lympstone village website
Lympstone Village Design Statement, East Devon Council
The Early History of Lympstone, Britannia.com, reproduced from The Lympstone Story: The Red Cliffs of Lympstone, Lympstone Society

Villages in Devon
Civil parishes in Devon
Seaside resorts in England
Ports and harbours of Devon